Bullfighter is a 2005 American action adventure fantasy film directed by Rune Bendixen and starring Olivier Martinez, Michelle Forbes, Donnie Wahlberg, Robert Rodriguez and Willem Dafoe.  It is Bendixen's feature directorial debut.

Cast
Willem Dafoe as Father Ramirez
Michael Parks as Cordobes
Jared Harris as Jones
Domenica Cameron-Scorsese as Laila
Robert Rodriguez as Bullboy #1
Guillermo del Toro as Bullboy #2
Olivier Martinez as Jacques
Michelle Forbes as Mary
Donnie Wahlberg as Chollo
Assumpta Serna as Ahandra / Allison
Rune Bendixen as Bullboy #3

Production
The film was shot across the Rio Grande in Texas starting on February 12, 1999.

Release
The film was released direct-to-DVD on January 4, 2005.

References

External links
 
 

2000s English-language films